Delanie Breann Sheehan (born January 13, 1999) is an American professional soccer player who plays as a midfielder for National Women's Soccer League (NWSL) club NJ/NY Gotham FC.

Club career 
Sheehan signed with NJ/NY Gotham FC in 2021.

References

External links 
 UCLA profile
 
 

1999 births
Living people
American women's soccer players
National Women's Soccer League players
NJ/NY Gotham FC draft picks
NJ/NY Gotham FC players
UCLA Bruins women's soccer players
United States women's under-20 international soccer players
Women's association football midfielders